Alstroemeria pygmaea is a species of monocotyledonous plant in the genus Alstroemeria, and in the family Alstroemeriaceae. It was described by William Herbert in 1837.

Distribution
A. pygmaea is found in South  America, from Peru to NW Argentina.

References

Further reading
Herb., 1837. In: Amaryllidaceae : 100

pygmaea